Malgorzata  (Gosha) S. Zywno Ph.D P.Eng is a Canadian engineer, and professor of engineering at Toronto Metropolitan University. She is a 3M Teaching Fellow.

Life and work 
Zywno was born in Poland and arrived in Canada as a government sponsored refugee, after she refused to join the PolishCommunist Party or work for the secret police.

She graduated from Technical University of Lodz, the University of Toronto, and from Glasgow Caledonian University. She received her P.Eng licence in 1984.

In her role at Toronto Metropolitan University she is a member of the Ryerson Women in Engineering Committee which encourages young women to consider engineering as a field of study.

Awards and honours 
She has received several awards for her teaching work, and promotion of engineering to women:
 Sharon Keillor Award for Women in Engineering Education from the American Society for Engineering Education (2005)
 Medal for Distinction in Engineering Education from the Canadian Council of Professional Engineers
 Member of the Professional Engineers Ontario Order of Honour

Works

References 

Living people
Canadian engineers
Canadian academics in engineering
University of Toronto alumni
Łódź University of Technology alumni
Alumni of Glasgow Caledonian University
Academic staff of Toronto Metropolitan University
Canadian women engineers
21st-century women engineers
Year of birth missing (living people)